Spårväg City is a tram line in central Stockholm, inaugurated in 2010. It is the first tram line in regular traffic in central Stockholm since 1967. The service is run by AB Stockholms Spårvägar for Storstockholms Lokaltrafik (SL), using the name "Route 7" ("Linje 7").

It is essentially an elongation of Djurgårdslinjen, which has been operated with historical cars since 1991 between Norrmalmstorg and Waldemarsudde. Djurgårdslinjen was first considered to be just a museum-tourist line, but has proven to be in much demand also by regular travels. Plans are to build the Spårväg City to reach from Kungsholmen in the west to the Lidingö bridge in the east, where it is suggested to be connected to Lidingöbanan.

The regular tram service between Sergels torg and Waldemarsudde started on 23 August 2010 with six Bombardier Flexity Classic trams. The cars were at first a dark, almost black, brown colour with gold stripes, as opposed to the traditional light blue trams of Stockholm prior to 1967, however due to complaints this was shortly changed to blue and white. An extension from Sergels torg to T-Centralen opened on 3 September 2018.

Djurgårdslinjen 

AB Stockholms Spårvägar will also continue driving the museum trams on the original Norrmalmstorg - Skansen line that opened in 1991. This line is called "Djurgårdslinjen" or "Linje 7N" (i.e. Line 7N, "N" for the destination Norrmalmstorg).

Controversy 
The building of the line has been somewhat controversial, as the opposition in the Municipal Assembly (kommunfullmäktige) claims the line is too expensive and that it only serves well-off areas of Östermalm. It has been nicknamed "NK-expressen", since it goes directly from prestigious Strandvägen to the fashionable department store Nordiska Kompaniet.

References

External links
 2021 Simplified map of Spårväg City line (pdf)

Tram transport in Sweden
Rail transport in Stockholm
2010 establishments in Sweden